State Highway 251A, also known as SH-251A or OK-251A, is a highway maintained by the U.S. state of Oklahoma. The highway runs from State Highway 16 in Okay, Oklahoma to State Highway 80 north of Ft. Gibson. It runs across the dam of Fort Gibson Lake. The highway was once part of SH-16.

Route description
SH-251A begins in Wagoner County at SH-16 in Okay and follows North York Road north out of town. Upon leaving town, the highway curves to the east. The highway proceeds due east until reaching the unincorporated settlement of Mallard Bay, where it curves to the southeast to avoid the eponymous bay. SH-251A curves back to the northeast, paralleling the short of Fort Gibson Lake, before reaching Fort Gibson Dam. The route crosses the Grand River along the top of the dam, entering Cherokee County in the process. After the SH-251A leaves the dam, it reaches its junction with SH-80 and ends.

History
What is now SH-251A was originally added to the state highway system as part of a 1955 extension of SH-16. The highway was paved at this time. In 1965, SH-16 was realigned to head north from Okay instead of east, and the vacated section of highway was assigned the SH-251A designation. No changes to SH-251A have occurred since.

Junction list

References

External links

 SH-251A at OKHighways

251A
Transportation in Wagoner County, Oklahoma
Transportation in Cherokee County, Oklahoma